The 35th Saturn Awards, honoring the best in science fiction, fantasy and horror film and television in 2008 were presented on June 25, 2009, in Burbank, California.

Below is a complete list of nominees and winners. Winners are highlighted in boldface.

Winners and nominees

Film

Television

Programs

Acting

DVD

Special awards

Visionary Award
Jeffrey Katzenberg for advancing 3D film presentation.

Life Career Award
Lance Henriksen

Lifetime Achievement Award
Leonard Nimoy

References

External links

 The Official Saturn Awards Site

Saturn Awards ceremonies
2008 awards in the United States
2009 in California
2008 film awards
2008 television awards